Thomas Timothy Manastersky (March 7, 1929 – March 11, 2012) was a Grey Cup Champion Canadian Football League halfback and the youngest to ever play in the CFL.

Turning professional right out of high school, Manastersky played 6 seasons and 68 regular season games for his hometown Montreal Alouettes. The high point of his football career was being part of the Alouettes first Grey Cup in 1949. He finished his career playing for the Saskatchewan Roughriders in 1954.

He was also one of the rare two-sport professional athletes. He had played hockey for the Montreal Royals, Cincinnati Mohawks and Victoria Cougars in the minor leagues, but in the 1950-51 NHL season he got called up. A big defenceman, he played six games for the Montreal Canadiens, recording only 11 penalty minutes.

He died on March 11, 2012, following a lengthy illness.

References

External links

 Legends of Hockey bio

1929 births
2012 deaths
Canadian ice hockey defencemen
High School of Montreal alumni
Canadian football people from Montreal
Montreal Alouettes players
Montreal Canadiens players
Players of Canadian football from Quebec
Saskatchewan Roughriders players
Ice hockey people from Quebec